The Nemo H2 is a passenger ship developed by Fuel Cell Boat for 88 people in Amsterdam for which the power for the electric motor is generated by a fuel cell on hydrogen. It is the first boat for 88 people in the Netherlands with a fuel cell. The keel laying was in Hasselt in 2008 and the first boat is in operation on the canals in Amsterdam since December 2009.

Specification
A boat for 87 passengers, 21.95 m long and 4.25 m wide with a depth of 1 meter and a height of 65 cm above the water, an 11 kW electric bow thruster and a 55 cm/75 kW electric azimuth thruster, 6 hydrogen storage tanks with a pressure of 35 MPa for 24 kg of hydrogen, with a 60-70 kW PEM fuel cell and an integrated 30-50 kW battery . The ship has a 9-hour range at a cruising speed of 9 knots. The hydrogen station is powered by NoordzeeWind for the electrolysis of water and has a production capacity of 60 m3 of hydrogen per hour which would be sufficient for two cruise boats.

See also
 Hydrogen ship
 Zemships

References

External links
Fuel Cell Boat

Hydrogen ships
Passenger ships